Fortosi is a village and a community in the municipal unit of Katsanochoria, Ioannina regional unit, Epirus, Greece. The community consists of the villages Fortosi, Kostitsi, Patero and Nistora. Fortosi is situated in the northern foothills of the mountain Xerovouni, west of the Arachthos valley, at about 800 m elevation. It is 10 km west of Pramanta, 21 km southeast of Ioannina and 39 km north of Arta. There is an ancient castle built around the 4th century BC 2 km south of Patero.

Population

See also

List of settlements in the Ioannina regional unit

External links
Municipality of Katsanochoria 
Fortosi at the GTP Travel Pages

References

Populated places in Ioannina (regional unit)